This article covers opinion polling for the 2022 Philippine presidential and vice presidential elections. Opinion polling in Philippines is conducted by Social Weather Stations (SWS), Pulse Asia, RP- Mission and Development Foundation Inc. (RPMD), OCTA Research, and other pollsters. Poll results are listed in the table below in reverse chronological order. The front-runner is in bold. Those that are within the margin of error are in italics.

Calendar 

 Filing of candidacies: October 1 to 8, 2021
 Deadline in substituting a candidate for it to appear on the ballot: November 15, 2021
 Campaign period for nationally elected positions: February 8 to May 7, 2022
 Campaign period for locally elected positions: March 25 to May 7, 2022
 Election day: May 9, 2022

Polling for president

Graphical summary

From the start of the campaign period to Election Day

From the end of candidacy filing to the start of the campaign period

Until candidacy filing ended in October 2021

Polling for vice president

Graphical summary

From the start of the campaign period to Election Day

From the end of candidacy filing to the start of the campaign period

Until candidacy filing ended in October 2021

Footnotes

References 

Opinion polling in the Philippines
2022 Philippine presidential election